The Official Gazette (Arabic: al-Jaridah al-rasmiyah-Jumhuriyat al-Yaman al-dimuqratiyah al-Sha'biyah) was the government gazette of the People's Democratic Republic of Yemen (1967 to 1990). It was published at Aden in English and Arabic.

See also
List of government gazettes

References

Arabic-language newspapers
South Yemen
Government of Yemen
Mass media in Aden
Newspapers established in 1967
Publications disestablished in 1990
1967 establishments in Yemen
1990 disestablishments in Yemen